Miss George Washington is a lost 1916 silent film comedy directed by J. Searle Dawley and starring Marguerite Clark. It was produced by Adolph Zukor through his Famous Players Film Company and distributed by Paramount Pictures.

Plot
A girl named Bernice Sommers gets herself and those around her into trouble by her constant fibbing. The films title makes the contrary allusion that George Washington never told a lie.

On December 1, 1917, the Belmont Courier in Belmont, Massachusetts printed a brief plot summary in an article about the movie showing at The Waverley Theatre on Trapelo Road (later renamed the Strand Theater and currently named The Studio Cinema):  "Marguerite Clark, the exquisite little Famous Players star who has become one of the foremost photoplay stars on the screen is presented at the Waverley Theatre on Wednesday next week on the Paramount Program in the screamingly funny farce "Miss George Washington" directed by J. Searle Dowley, in which the little star plays the part of a girl who cannot tell the truth but who is reputed to never have told a lie in her life.  It is one of the cleverest roles in which she has appeared."

Cast
Marguerite Clark - Bernice Somers
Frank Losee - Judge Altwold
Niles Welch - Cleverley Trafton
Florence Martin - Alice Altwold
Joseph Gleason - Paul Carroll
Maude Turner Gordon - Mrs. Altwold
Billy Watson - Miss Perkins
Herbert Prior - Colonel J.P. Worthington

uncredited
Charlotte Greenwood - attendee at tea social

References

External links

 
 

1916 films
American silent feature films
Lost American films
Films directed by J. Searle Dawley
Films based on short fiction
Paramount Pictures films
1916 comedy films
Silent American comedy films
American black-and-white films
1916 lost films
Lost comedy films
1910s American films